"Give U My Heart" is a song recorded by American R&B singers Babyface and Toni Braxton for the soundtrack to the 1992 film Boomerang, starring Eddie Murphy. The collaboration was released as a single the same year, reaching No. 29 on the US Billboard Hot 100 and No. 2 on the Billboard Hot R&B Singles chart (behind another song from the Boomerang soundtrack, Boyz II Men's "End of the Road").

The song can be found on two of Braxton's greatest-hits albums, 2003's Ultimate Toni Braxton and 2007's The Essential Toni Braxton, and as a B-side on some editions of her 1993 single "Another Sad Love Song".

The "Upscale R&B Remix" version is played during the end credits of Boomerang.

Critical reception
Dennis Hunt from Los Angeles Times described the song as a "sultry" duet.

Track listings and formats
 US 12" single
A1. "Give U My Heart" (Extended Remix) – 6:55
A2. "Give U My Heart" (Album Version) (Pumped Up) – 4:59
A3. "Give U My Heart" (Instrumental) – 5:00
B1. "Give U My Heart" (Remix Radio Edit) – 4:15
B2. "Give U My Heart" (Mad Ball Mix) – 4:10
B3. "Give U My Heart" (Smooth & Wet Remix) – 4:15
B4. "Give U My Heart" (Upscale R&B Remix) – 4:42

 Dutch 12" single
A1. "Give U My Heart" (Remix Radio Edit) – 4:15
A2. "Give U My Heart" (Mad Ball Mix) – 4:10
B1. "Give U My Heart" (Album Radio Edit) – 4:05
B2. "Give U My Heart" (Extended Remix) – 6:55

Charts

Weekly charts

Year-end charts

References

1992 debut singles
1992 songs
Babyface (musician) songs
Toni Braxton songs
LaFace Records singles
Songs written by Daryl Simmons
Songs written by Babyface (musician)
Songs written by L.A. Reid
Song recordings produced by Babyface (musician)
Song recordings produced by L.A. Reid
Song recordings produced by Daryl Simmons
Songs written for films
Male–female vocal duets